Eike Bansen (born 21 February 1998) is a German professional footballer who plays as a goalkeeper for Atlas Delmenhorst.

Club career
On 17 June 2021, Bansen returned to Germany and signed a two-year contract with TSV Steinbach Haiger in Regionalliga Südwest.

International career
Bansen was Germany's first-choice goalkeeper at the 2017 UEFA European Under-19 Championship, in which Germany lost 4–1 to both Netherlands and England and beat Bulgaria 3–0, and did not advance from the group stage.

References

1998 births
Footballers from Dortmund
Living people
German footballers
Association football goalkeepers
Germany youth international footballers
Borussia Dortmund II players
Borussia Dortmund players
S.V. Zulte Waregem players
TSV Steinbach Haiger players
Atlas Delmenhorst players
Belgian Pro League players
Regionalliga players
German expatriate footballers
German expatriate sportspeople in Belgium
Expatriate footballers in Belgium